Oberea annamensis is a species of longhorn beetle in the tribe Saperdini in the genus Oberea, discovered by Breuning in 1969.

References

A
Beetles described in 1969